Victor Kamhuka (born 2 April 1990) is Zimbabwean footballer who plays as a defender for Pretoria Callies in National First Division.

Club career

Dynamos Harare
On 1 July 2013, Victor Kamkuka was signed by Dynamos Harare Zimbabwe, a first-division club in Zimbabwe as a defender and spent there 2013–17 and joined Premier Soccer League.

Pathachakra
In August 2017, Victor Kamhuka joined Calcutta Football League side Pathachakra. He played all the 9 League matches and scored one goal.

In August 2018, he returned to Pathachakra for 2018–19 CFL Season. He played all the 11 league matches for the club and scored two goals.

Manang Marshyangdi Club
In December 2018, Kamhuka joined Nepali club Manang Marshyangdi as their fourth foreign signing.

Southern Samity
In 2021, he moved to Calcutta Football League side Southern Samity.

Đông Á Thanh Hóa
In February 2022, Kamhuka joined Đông Á Thanh Hóa in V.League 1 for first haft of season. He played 10 games and 5 of them were clean-sheet games.

Pretoria Callies
In February 2023, Kamhuka joined Pretoria Callies in National First Division for a season.

International career
He made his debut for Zimbabwe national football team on 29 March 2021 in a 2021 Africa Cup of Nations qualifier against Zambia.

References

External links
http://www.kickoff.com/mobile/news/20224/mpumalanga-black-aces-sign-zimbabwean-defender-victor-kamhuka
https://www.herald.co.zw/kamhuka-relishes-malaysian-dance/amp/

1990 births
Sportspeople from Harare
Living people
Zimbabwean footballers
Zimbabwe youth international footballers
Zimbabwe under-20 international footballers
Zimbabwe international footballers
Association football defenders
Eagles F.C. (Zimbabwe) players
Mpumalanga Black Aces F.C. players
Black Leopards F.C. players
Dynamos F.C. players
How Mine F.C. players
Manang Marshyangdi Club players
Bhawanipore FC players
Ayeyawady United F.C. players
PDRM FA players
South African Premier Division players
Myanmar National League players
Malaysia Premier League players
Zimbabwean expatriate footballers
Expatriate soccer players in South Africa
Expatriate footballers in India
Expatriate footballers in Nepal
Expatriate footballers in Myanmar
Expatriate footballers in Malaysia
Calcutta Football League players